Ain Sud, previously Ain Sud Foot, is a French association football team founded in 1999. They are based in Saint-Maurice-de-Beynost, Auvergne-Rhône-Alpes, France and are currently playing in the Championnat National 3 Group M, since the 2017–18 season. They play at the Stade du Forum, which has a capacity of 500.

The club created in 1999 is a fusion among small local clubs: Olympique Saint-Maurice, ES Beynost, US Miribel and FC Neyron. In July 2020 the club is renamed in simply Ain Sud.

People of Ain Sud

Presidents 
From the 20 of December 2019, Bertrand Paris is the Président of Ain Sud. He replaced the historic President Maurice Bourgeon in place from the creation of the club in 1999.

Coaches

Notable players

 Hervé Della Maggiore 2000-2002

Former logos

References

External links
 Official website

 
Association football clubs established in 1999
1999 establishments in France
Football clubs in Auvergne-Rhône-Alpes
Sport in Ain